East West Bank, the primary subsidiary of East West Bancorp, Inc., is the largest publicly traded bank headquartered in Southern California, United States. It was founded in 1973 in Los Angeles to serve the Chinese American community in Southern California. It is a premier bank focused exclusively on the United States and Greater China markets and operates over 120 locations in the U.S. and China, including in the markets of California, Georgia, Massachusetts, Nevada, New York, Texas and Washington. In China, East West Bank's presence includes full service branches in Hong Kong, Shanghai, Shantou and Shenzhen, and representative offices in Beijing, Chongqing, Guangzhou, and Xiamen. Forbes magazine has recognized East West Bank as one of “America’s Best Banks” since 2010. In 2018, Forbes ranked East West Bank number five of "America's 100 Biggest Banks."

History

In 1973, East West Federal Bank was founded by F. Chow Chan, Betty Tom Chu, Richard K. Quan, Gilbert L. Leong, Philip Chow, John A Nuccio, Christopher L. Pocino, and John M. Lee. Its focus was to serve the Chinese American community in Southern California.

In 1991, during the savings and loan crisis, the company acquired Pacific Coast Savings, which increased the bank's assets from $600 million to $1 billion and expanded operations to San Francisco, California

In 1992, Dominic Ng was named the Chairman, CEO and President of the company, replacing Kellogg Chan who retired.

East West Bank became a state-chartered commercial bank on July 31, 1995.

In 1999, the company acquired First Central Bank for $13.5 million in cash.

In August 2004, the company acquired Trust Bank, a Chinese American bank based in Monterey Park, California, with four branches and $235 million in assets, for $32.9 million.

In September 2005, the company acquired United National Bank, a commercial bank headquartered in San Marino, California, with 11 branches and $665 million in loans receivable, for $177.9 million.

In March 2006, the company acquired Standard Bank, a Chinese-American bank headquartered in Monterey Park, California, with 6 branches and $923 million in assets, for $200 million.

In August 2007, the company acquired Desert Community Bank, a community bank operating in the Victor Valley region of California. Desert Community Bank branches remained branded as such and did not change to East West Bank. In November 2017, East West Bank agreed to sell Desert Community Bank to Flagstar Bank; the deal was completed in March 2018.  

In 2009, the company acquired the assets of United Commercial Bank (UCB), via a transaction facilitated by the Federal Deposit Insurance Corporation. This expanded East West Bank's reach by 63 branches, including 17 in Southern California, and branches in the Chinese American communities of Houston, Boston, and Atlanta, as well as branches in Hong Kong and China.

In January 2010, Irene H. Oh was promoted to EVP and CFO, replacing Thomas J. Tolda, who resigned.

In 2010, the company acquired the assets, including four branches, of Washington First International Bank of Seattle, Washington, via a transaction facilitated by the Federal Deposit Insurance Corporation.

In 2014, the company acquired MetroCorp Bancshares, which operated as MetroBank, for $268 million in cash and stock.

Senior leadership 
The bank has been led by a single chairman, president, and CEO - all 3 positions being one person - since its founding in 1973.

List of chairmen, presidents, and CEOs 

 F. Chow Chan (1973–1976)
 Kellogg Chan (1976–1992)
 Dominic Ng (since 1992)

Sponsoring

The bank's spokeswoman was figure skater Michelle Kwan.

East West Bank purchased the naming rights to the East West Ice Palace, an ice rink arena in Artesia, California.

References

External links

 East West Bank

Banks based in California
Chinese American banks
American companies established in 1973
Banks established in 1973
Chinese-American culture in California
Companies based in Pasadena, California
1973 establishments in California